Delusional parasitosis (DP) is a mental disorder in which individuals have a persistent belief that they are infested with living or nonliving pathogens such as parasites, insects, or bugs, when no such infestation is present. They usually report tactile hallucinations known as formication, a sensation resembling insects crawling on or under the skin.  Morgellons is considered to be a subtype of this condition, in which individuals have sores that they believe contain harmful fibers.

Delusional parasitosis is classified as a delusional disorder in the Diagnostic and Statistical Manual of Mental Disorders (DSM5). The cause is unknown, but is thought to be related to excess dopamine in the brain.  Delusional parasitosis is diagnosed when the delusion is the only symptom of psychosis and the delusion—that cannot be better explained by another condition—has lasted a month or longer. Few individuals with the condition willingly accept treatment, because they do not recognize the illness as a delusion. Antipsychotic medications offer a potential cure, while cognitive behavioral therapy and antidepressants can be used to help alleviate symptoms.

The condition is rare, and is observed twice as often in women as men. The average age of people with the disorder is 57. An alternative name, Ekbom's syndrome, refers to the neurologist Karl-Axel Ekbom, who published seminal accounts of the disease in 1937 and 1938.

Classification 
Delusional infestation is classified as a delusional disorder of the somatic subtype in the Diagnostic and Statistical Manual of Mental Disorders (DSM5).  The name delusional parasitosis has been the most common name since 2015, but the condition has also been called delusional infestation, delusory parasitosis, delusional ectoparasitosis, psychogenic parasitosis, Ekbom syndrome, dermatophobia, parasitophobia, formication and "cocaine bugs".

Morgellons is a form of delusional parasitosis in which people have painful skin sensations that they believe contain fibers of various kinds; its presentation is very similar to other delusional infestations, but people with this self-diagnosed condition also believe that strings or fibers are present in their skin lesions.

Delusory cleptoparasitosis is a form of delusion of parasitosis where the person believes the infestation is in their dwelling, rather than on or in their body.

Signs and symptoms

People with delusional parasitosis believe that "parasites, worms, mites, bacteria, fungus" or some other living organism has infected them, and reasoning or logic will not dissuade them from this belief. Details vary among those who have the condition, though it typically manifests as a crawling and pin-pricking sensation that is most commonly described as involving perceived parasites crawling upon or burrowing into the skin, sometimes accompanied by an actual physical sensation (known as formication). Affected people may injure themselves in attempts to be rid of the "parasites"; resulting skin damage includes excoriation, bruising and cuts, as well as damage caused from using chemical substances and obsessive cleansing routines.

A "preceding event such as a bug bite, travel, sharing clothes, or contact with an infected person" is often identified by individuals with DP; such events may lead the individual to misattribute symptoms because of more awareness of symptoms they were previously able to ignore. Nearly any marking upon the skin, or small object or particle found on the person or their clothing, can be interpreted as evidence for the parasitic infestation, and individuals with the condition commonly compulsively gather such "evidence" to present to medical professionals. This presentation is known as the "matchbox sign", "Ziploc bag sign" or "specimen sign", because the "evidence" is frequently presented in a small container, such as a matchbox. The matchbox sign is present in five to eight out of every ten people with DP.  Related is a "digital specimen sign", in which individuals bring collections of photographs to document their condition.

Similar delusions may be present in close relatives—a shared condition known as a folie à deux—that occurs in 5–15% of cases and is considered a shared psychotic disorder. Because the internet and the media contribute to furthering shared delusions, DP has also been called folie à Internet; when affected people are separated, their symptoms typically subside, but most still require treatment.

Approximately eight out of ten individuals with DP have co-occurring conditions—mainly depression, followed by substance abuse and anxiety; their personal and professional lives are frequently disrupted as they are extremely distressed about their symptoms.

A 2011 Mayo Clinic study of 108 patients failed to find evidence of skin infestation in skin biopsies and patient-provided specimens; the study concluded that the feeling of skin infestation was DP.

Cause 
The cause of delusional parasitosis is unknown. It may be related to excess dopamine in the brain's striatum, resulting from diminished dopamine transporter (DAT) function, which regulates dopamine reuptake in the brain. Evidence supporting the dopamine theory is that medications that inhibit dopamine reuptake (for example cocaine and amphetamines) are known to induce symptoms such as formication. Other conditions that also demonstrate reduced DAT functioning are known to cause secondary DP; these conditions include "schizophrenia, depression, traumatic brain injury, alcoholism, Parkinson's and Huntington's diseases, human immunodeficiency virus infection, and iron deficiency". Further evidence is that antipsychotics improve DP symptoms, which may be because they affect dopamine transmission.

Diagnosis
Delusional parasitosis is diagnosed when the delusion is the only symptom of psychosis, the delusion has lasted a month or longer, behavior is otherwise not markedly odd or impaired, mood disorders—if present at any time—have been comparatively brief, and the delusion cannot be better explained by another medical condition, mental disorder, or the effects of a substance. For diagnosis, the individual must attribute abnormal skin sensations to the belief that they have an infestation, and be convinced that they have an infestation even when evidence shows they do not.

The condition is recognized in two forms: primary and secondary. In primary delusional parasitosis, the delusions are the only manifestation of a psychiatric disorder. Secondary delusional parasitosis occurs when another psychiatric condition, medical illness or substance (medical or recreational) use causes the symptoms; in these cases, the delusion is a symptom of another condition rather than the disorder itself. Secondary forms of DP can be functional (due to mainly psychiatric disorders) or organic (due to other medical illness or organic disease. The secondary organic form may be related to vitamin B12 deficiency, hypothyroidism, anemia, hepatitis, diabetes, HIV/AIDS, syphilis, or abuse of cocaine.

Examination to rule out other causes is key to diagnosis.  Parasitic infestations are ruled out via skin examination and laboratory analyses. Bacterial infections may be present as a result of the individual constantly manipulating their skin. Other conditions that can cause itching skin are also ruled out; this includes a review of medications that may lead to similar symptoms.  Testing to rule out other conditions helps build a trusting relationship with the physician; this can include laboratory analysis such as a complete blood count, comprehensive metabolic panel, erythrocyte sedimentation rate, C-reactive protein, urinalysis for toxicology and thyroid-stimulating hormone, in addition to skin biopsies and dermatological tests to detect or rule out parasitic infestations.  Depending on symptoms, tests may be done for "human immunodeficiency virus, syphilis, viral hepatitis, B12 or folate deficiency", and allergies.

Differential 
Delusional parasitosis must be distinguished from scabies, mites, and other psychiatric conditions that may occur along with the delusion; these include schizophrenia, dementia, anxiety disorders, obsessive–compulsive disorder, and affective or substance-induced psychoses or other conditions such as anemia that may cause psychosis.

Pruritus and other skin conditions are most commonly caused by mites, but may also be caused by "grocer's itch" from agricultural products, pet-induced dermatitis, caterpillar/moth dermatitis, or exposure to fiberglass.  Several drugs, legal or illegal, such as amphetamines, dopamine agonists, opioids, and cocaine may also cause the skin sensations reported.  Diseases that must be ruled out in differential diagnosis include hypothyroidism, and kidney or liver disease. Many of these physiological factors, as well as environmental factors such as airborne irritants, are capable of inducing a "crawling" sensation in otherwise healthy individuals; some people become fixated on the sensation and its possible meaning, and this fixation may then develop into DP.

Treatment
As of 2019, there have not been any studies that compare available treatments to placebo. The only treatment that provides a cure, and the most effective treatment, is low doses of antipsychotic medication.  Cognitive behavioral therapy (CBT) can also be useful. Risperidone is the treatment of choice.  For many years, the treatment of choice was pimozide, but it has a higher side effect profile than the newer antipsychotics.  Aripiprazole and ziprasidone are effective but have not been well studied for delusional parasitosis. Olanzapine is also effective. All are used at the lowest possible dosage, and increased gradually until symptoms remit.

People with the condition often reject the professional medical diagnosis of delusional parasitosis, and few willingly undergo treatment, despite demonstrable efficacy, making the condition difficult to manage. Reassuring the individual with DP that there is no evidence of infestation is usually ineffective, as the patient may reject that. Because individuals with DP typically see many physicians with different specialties, and feel a sense of isolation and depression, gaining the patient's trust, and collaborating with other physicians, are key parts of the treatment approach. Dermatologists may have more success introducing the use of medication as a way to alleviate the distress of itching. Directly confronting individuals about delusions is unhelpful because by definition, the delusions are not likely to change; confrontation of beliefs via CBT is accomplished in those who are open to psychotherapy. A five-phase approach to treatment is outlined by Heller et al. (2013) that seeks to establish rapport and trust between physician and patient.

Prognosis 
The average duration of the condition is about three years.  The condition leads to social isolation and affects employment.  Cure may be achieved with antipsychotics or by treating underlying psychiatric conditions.

Epidemiology
While a rare disorder, delusional parasitosis is the most common of the hypochondriacal psychoses, and more common than other types of delusions such as those associated with body odor or halitosis.  It may be undetected because those who have it do not see a psychiatrist because they don't recognize the condition as a delusion.  A population-based study in Olmsted County, Minnesota, found a prevalence of 27 per 100,000 person-years and an incidence of almost 2 cases per 100,000 person-years. The majority of dermatologists will see at least one person with DP during their career.

It is observed twice as often in women than men. The highest incidence occurs in people in their 60s, but there is also a higher occurrence in people in their 30s, associated with substance use.  It occurs most often in "socially isolated" women with an average age of 57.

Since the early 2000s, a strong internet presence has led to increasing self-diagnosis of Morgellons.

History
Karl-Axel Ekbom, a Swedish neurologist, first described delusional parasitosis as "pre-senile delusion of infestation" in 1937. The common name has changed many times since then.  Ekbom originally used the German word dermatozoenwahn, but other countries used the term Ekbom's syndrome. That term fell out of favor because it also referred to restless legs syndrome. Other names that referenced "phobia" were rejected because anxiety disorder was not typical of the symptoms. The eponymous Ekbom's disease was changed to "delusions of parasitosis" in 1946 in the English literature, when researchers J Wilson and H Miller described a series of cases, and to "delusional infestation" in 2009. The most common name since 2015 has been "delusional parasitosis".

Ekbom's original was translated to English in 2003; the authors hypothesized that James Harrington (1611–1677) may have been the "first recorded person to suffer from such delusions when he 'began to imagine that his sweat turned to flies, and sometimes to bees and other insects'."

Morgellons 

Mary Leitao, the founder of the Morgellons Research Foundation, coined the name Morgellons in 2002, reviving it from a letter written by a physician in the mid-1600s. Leitao and others involved in her foundation (who self-identified as having Morgellons) successfully lobbied members of the U.S. Congress and the U.S. Centers for Disease Control and Prevention (CDC) to investigate the condition in 2006. The CDC published the results of its multi-year study in January 2012. The study found no underlying infectious condition and few disease organisms were present in people with Morgellons; the fibers found were likely cotton, and the condition was "similar to more commonly recognized conditions such as delusional infestation".

An active online community has supported the notion that Morgellons is an infectious disease, and propose an association with Lyme disease. Publications "largely from a single group of investigators" describe findings of spirochetes, keratin and collagen in skin samples of a small number of individuals; these findings are contradicted by the much larger studies conducted by the CDC.

Society and culture 
Jay Traver (1894–1974), a University of Massachusetts entomologist, was known for "one of the most remarkable mistakes ever published in a scientific entomological journal", after publishing a 1951 account of what she called a mite infestation which was later shown to be incorrect, and that has been described by others as a classic case of delusional parasitosis as evidenced by her own detailed description.  Matan Shelomi argues that the historical paper should be retracted because it has misled people about their delusion. He says the paper has done "permanent and lasting damage" to people with delusional parasitosis, "who widely circulate and cite articles such as Traver's and other pseudoscientific or false reports" via the internet, making treatment and cure more difficult.

Shelomi published another study in 2013 of what he called scientific misconduct when a 2004 article in the Journal of the New York Entomological Society included what he says is photo manipulation of a matchbox specimen to support the claim that individuals with DP are infested with collembola.

See also 
 Stimulant psychosis
 Formication

References

Further reading 
 
 

 
Hallucinations
Psychosis
Symptoms and signs of mental disorders
Neurocutaneous conditions
Delusional disorders
Psychopathological syndromes
Delusions